Rebecca Clough (born 14 November 1988) is an Australian rugby union player. She was a member of the Australian squad that finished in third place in the 2010 Women's Rugby World Cup. She was named in 's 2014 Women's Rugby World Cup squad, her second World Cup appearance.

Clough was named Australian women's player of the year at the national rugby championships in 2010. She is known for her ferocious defence, hard hitting and strong leadership.

As of 2015, she plays club rugby for Cottesloe in Western Australia, and is a Western Australian representative.

As of 2015, Clough was training in the national squad and planning to compete in her third World Cup in 2017.

References

External links
Wallaroos profile

1988 births
Living people
Australia women's international rugby union players
Australian female rugby union players
Sportswomen from New South Wales
Rugby union locks
Rugby union players from Sydney